Gumboro may refer to:

 Gumboro, Delaware
 Gumboro Hundred, an unincorporated subdivision of Sussex County, Delaware (see List of hundreds of Delaware)